Elections were held in Perth County, Ontario on October 25, 2010 in conjunction with municipal elections across the province.

Perth County Council

North Perth

Perth East

Perth South

West Perth

References

2010 Ontario municipal elections
Perth County, Ontario